is a railway station in Higashihiroshima, Hiroshima Prefecture, Japan, operated by West Japan Railway Company (JR West).

Lines
Nyūno Station is served by the Sanyō Main Line.

Layout
Two side platforms are on the ground. The station is not staffed and the former office space is used as a local community hall.

See also
List of railway stations in Japan

External links

  

Railway stations in Hiroshima Prefecture
Sanyō Main Line
Railway stations in Japan opened in 1953